Highest Hopes: The Best of Nightwish is the third compilation album by Finnish symphonic metal band Nightwish. Their first, Tales from the Elvenpath, was considered incomplete by many fans as it contains only tracks from Oceanborn, Over the Hills and Far Away, Wishmaster and Century Child, leaving out Angels Fall First. This compilation, though, contains songs from all previously released Nightwish albums, plus a live cover of Pink Floyd's "High Hopes".

Highest Hopes was released in three different formats: Standard, Special Edition and Extended 2 CD. In addition to the normal version, a special edition was released, omitting the song "Deep Silent Complete" and replacing it with the popular cover version of The Phantom of the Opera theme, it also contains a bonus DVD containing three full songs filmed live at the Mera Luna Festival in Hildesheim, Germany in 2003.

The Extended Version is a 2-CD compilation with CD1 the same as the Standard Version plus a 2nd CD of eight audio tracks from the Tarja Turunen period and includes a bonus DVD containing ten video tracks; Three full songs ( Tracks 1-3 ) filmed live at the M'era Luna Festival in Hildesheim, Germany in 2003 ( Identical to the Special Edition Bonus DVD but in an altered running order), three studio videos ( Tracks 4-6 ) and a further four full live songs (Tracks 7-10 ) filmed live at the Summer Breeze Festival in Germany in 2002 . All versions feature a new (2005) recording of the song "Sleeping Sun" and a live version of Pink Floyd's "High Hopes" from which this compilation takes its name.

The album was certified platinum in Finland – for sales exceeding 40,000 copies – the same day it was released, and also was gold in Norway with more than 20,000 sold copies. It was also Finland's best-selling album of 2005, having sold more than 65,000 copies, certified with double platinum. Today, it has sold more than 103,000 copies.

Track listing

Sales and certifications

Charts

Credits
Tarja Turunen - Lead vocals
Tuomas Holopainen - Keyboards, spoken parts and backing vocals (on tracks 5 and 10)
Emppu Vuorinen - Lead guitars
Jukka Nevalainen - Drums
Marko Hietala - Bass guitar and male vocals
Sam Hardwick - Spoken parts (on track 6 and 15)
Tony Kakko - Backing vocals (on track 10)
London Philharmonic Orchestra - Choir (on track 1 and 7)

References

External links 
 
Nightwish's Official Website

Nightwish albums
2005 greatest hits albums